Ancylolomia saundersiella, 
the Black-streaked grass-moth  is a moth in the family Crambidae. It was described by Zeller in 1863. It is found in South India, and is known from Pune, Mumbai, Bangalore, and other parts.

References

Ancylolomia
Moths described in 1863
Moths of Asia